The 2003 FIA GT Pergusa 500 km was the third round the 2003 FIA GT Championship.  It took place at the Autodromo di Pergusa, Italy, on 11 May 2003.

Official results
Class winners in bold.  Cars failing to complete 70% of winner's distance marked as Not Classified (NC).

† - #22 BMS Scuderia Italia was disqualified for failing post-race technical inspection.  The car was found to have an airbox which allowed air to leak back out.

Statistics
 Pole position - #2 Konrad Motorsport - 1:34.939
 Fastest lap - #50 Freisinger Motorsport - 1:40.755
 Average speed - 171.320 km/h

References

 
 
 

P
FIA GT